The Enigma Birth is the fourth full-length album by Timo Tolkki's Finnish metal opera project Avalon, released on June 18, 2021.

As with the previous effort, several heavy metal singers were invited to play the characters of the story of the album.

The album was announced on 14 April 2021 alongside a video for "Beauty and War" (featuring Raphael Mendes). On 27 of the same month, a video for "Master of Hell", also featuring Mendes, was released. On 10 May, Avalon released a video for "The Fire and the Sinner" (featuring Jake E and Brittney Slayes). On the day of the album's release, a lyric video for "Beautiful Lie" (featuring James LaBrie) was published.

According to Tolkki, he created a fourth part for the trilogy out of contractual obligations with Frontiers Records. In September, he wrote around 10 tracks for the album and the label picked about half for the final track list; the remaining songs were written by a team of unacquainted Italian songwriters. He also claimed he doesn't know most of the guests, who were all suggested by the label.

Critical reception 

Writing for Metal.de, Jannik Kleemann praised the performances of the guest singers, called Tolkki "a good guitarist" that "can write good material", but said "the atmosphere of projects like Avantasia is clearly denser". Nevertheless, he concluded his review by saying that "what remains is a decent, symphonic power metal album".

Jonathan Smith, at Sonic Perspectives, said that "for an album that isn't that much of a stylistic enigma, it nevertheless provides an assortment of anthems so fun and varied that frequent replays are a virtual certainty" and ultimately called it "an album not to be missed".

Track listing

Personnel
Per sources.

Instrumentalists
 Timo Tolkki (ex-Stratovarius, Symfonia, Revolution Renaissance) – guitars
 Aldo Lonobile (Secret Sphere) – guitars
 Federico Maraucci – additional guitars
 Andrea Arcangeli (Concept, DGM) – bass
 Antonio Agate (Secret Sphere) – keyboards and orchestrations
 Marco Lazzarini (Secret Sphere) – drums

Vocalists
 James LaBrie (Dream Theater, MullMuzzler)
 Jake E (ex-Amaranthe, Cyhra)
 Marina La Torraca (Phantom Elite, Exit Eden)
 Brittney Hayes (Unleash the Archers)
 Raphael Mendes (Icon of Sin)
 Fabio Lione (ex-Labyrinth, ex-Vision Divine, ex-Rhapsody of Fire, Turilli / Lione Rhapsody, Angra, Eternal Idol)
 Caterina Nix (Chaos Magic)
 PelleK

Production
 Timo Tolkki & Aldo Lonobile - production

Charts

References

2021 albums
Rock operas
Concept albums
Frontiers Records albums
Timo Tolkki albums